Alan Jones Live was a nightly Australian current affairs and talk-back television program that aired on Network Ten from 31 January 1994 to 28 April 1994. Hosted by then 2UE Sydney radio broadcaster Alan Jones, it aired nationally at 7:00 pm each weeknight and was repeated at 11:30 pm.

On 28 April 1994, it was announced that program would cease production due to low ratings.

See also
 List of programs broadcast by Network Ten
 List of Australian television series

References

Australian non-fiction television series
Network 10 original programming
Television in Sydney
1994 Australian television series debuts
1994 Australian television series endings